Lansvale is a suburb of Sydney, in the state of New South Wales, Australia 28 kilometres south-west of the Sydney central business district, the other side of Chipping Norton and its lake, in the local government areas of the City of Fairfield and is part of the South-western Sydney region.

History
Lansvale took its name from a combination of the names of the neighbouring suburbs of Lansdowne and Canley Vale. This area was a most popular recreational site of the early twentieth century. Latty's Pleasure Grounds, the Butterfly Hall, Hollywood Park and the Lansdowne Reserve were popular ventures which fringed the river and lakes system. The amusement parks were struggling by the time of the Great Depression and eventually the land that they occupied was acquired by the council for public reserves.  It is a little-known fact that the first games of Rugby League football in Australia, in early 1908, were trial games that took place in Lansvale, at Latty's Pleasure Grounds.  This was before the first official competition games tookplace at venues closer to the City of Sydney, and well before professional Rugby League clubs came to the further western suburbs of Sydney, such as Parramatta, Canterbury-Bankstown and Western Suburbs.

The suburb developed in the 1950s when the peripheral areas of Bankstown municipality assumed identities of their own. One popular housing estate is known as River Heights, where stylishly designed houses with every modern detail and a luxurious finish have been built.

A local landmark is Lansdowne Bridge, a sandstone bridge built between 1834 and 1836, designed and supervised by David Lennox. The bridge is listed on the (now defunct) Register of the National Estate. Magic Kingdom was an amusement park that operated in Lansvale from the 1970s to the 1990s.

Heritage listings 
Lansvale has a number of heritage-listed sites, including:
 Hume Highway: Lansdowne Bridge

People
According to the 2016 census, Lansvale had a population of 2,570 people with a median age of 39, which was slightly higher than the national median age of 38. About half of these people were born in Australia (49.2%), with the other most common countries of birth being Vietnam (21.4%), New Zealand (1.9%), China (excludes SARs and Taiwan) (1.9%), Cambodia (1.8%) and Lebanon (1.6%). The majority of people spoke a language other than English at home (62.0%), with Vietnamese (31.1%), Arabic (7.0%), Cantonese (3.9%), Khmer (2.0%) and Mandarin (1.8%) forming the top responses for languages spoken at home. The most common responses for religion were Catholic 23.4%, Buddhism 21.5% and No Religion 17.1%.

Housing
As at the 2016 census, Lansvale had a total of 756 occupied private dwellings, of which 96.0% were separate houses, 2.2% were semi-detached dwellings, 0.7% were flats or apartments and 1.1% were other dwellings. Of these occupied private dwellings, 38.7% were owned outright, 35.9% were owned with a mortgage and 21.1% were rented.

See also
 Magic Kingdom, Sydney

References

Suburbs of Sydney
City of Fairfield